William Auerbach-Levy (February 14, 1889 – June 29, 1964) was a Belarusian born American artist of Jewish origin known for his paintings, etchings and caricatures.

Life and career
Auerbach-Levy was Jewish, was born in Brest in Belarus (at that time Brest-Litovsk, Russian Empire), and emigrated with his family to the United States in 1894. He studied in New York City and Paris, and subsequently taught at the Educational Alliance Art School and the National Academy of Design. In 1928 he was awarded a Guggenheim Fellowship. He was elected into the National Academy of Design as an Associate member in 1926, and became a full member in 1958.

Auerbach-Levy authored several books on the art of caricature, and his work in that vein, often featuring celebrities and theatrical personalities as his subjects, appeared in The New Yorker, Vanity Fair and American Heritage.

He was a member of the Society of American Graphic Artists.

His wife, Florence Von Wien, who collaborated with him on one of his books, died in 1957. Auerbach-Levy died at the age of 75 on June 29, 1964, in Ossining, New York.

His works are in the collections of the Art Institute of Chicago, the Boston Museum of Fine Arts, the New York Public Library, the Library of Congress, the Cleveland Museum of Art and Luther College.

Publications
 Auerbach-Levy, William and Von Wien, Florence. Is That Me? A Book About Caricature. New York, NY: Watson-Guptill Publications, 1947.
 Auerbach-Levy, William. The Art of Caricature. Art Book Guild of America, 1947.

Further reading
 Falk, Peter. Who Was Who in American Art, 1564-1975. Madison, Connecticut: Sound View Press, 1999
 Sorel, Edward. "Perfectly Simple," in American Heritage, Vol. 37 (June/July 1986), 50-56.
 Watson, Ernest W. "The Caricatures of William Auerbach-Levy," in Art Instruction, Vol. 2. (April 1938), 5-10.

References

External links
 Cleveland Museum of Art
 "Perfectly Simple", American Heritage
 Finding aid for the William Auerbach-Levy drawings at the Museum of the City of New York
William Auerbach-Levy, Artist and Neighborhood Preservationist from the Museum of the City of New York Collections blog

1889 births
1964 deaths
Belarusian Jews
Emigrants from the Russian Empire to the United States
American people of Belarusian-Jewish descent
20th-century American painters
American male painters
American caricaturists
American etchers
Jewish American artists
20th-century American printmakers
20th-century American male artists